Automechanika is the world's biggest trade fair for the automobile aftermarket. It is held every two years (in even years) at the Messe Frankfurt. In distinction to the Motor Show, Automechanika is open to trading visitors only.

History 
On 20 January 1971, the organizer of the Frankfurt Motor Show, the Association of the German Automobile Industry (Verband der Deutschen Automobilindustrie – VDA) canceled the show scheduled to be held the following September. According to the President of the Association, Dr. Johann Heinrich von Brunn, this was because the automobile industry needed to take cost-saving measures to counteract the high costs facing it. The cost of the exhibition – almost DM 100 million – was considered to be excessive in comparison to the business benefits. For the Frankfurt-based fair and exhibition company, Messe Frankfurt, cancellation would have meant a loss of at least DM 1.5 to 2 million in revenues. 
In mid-March 1971, Messe Frankfurt announced that a new event – Automechanika 71 – would be held instead of the Motor Show. The initiative for this came from the associations of the motor-vehicle and filling station and garage trades that still wanted to present their products. Manufacturers of automotive parts account for around 90 percent of exhibitors at the Frankfurt Motor Show.

The first Automechanika was held from 18 to 26 September 1971 and attracted around 400 exhibitors and 75,000 visitors. The fair was repeated in 1972 and held thereafter every two years in alternation with the Frankfurt Motor Show.

Development 
The 25th Automechanika Frankfurt took place from 11 to 15 September 2018. Approx. 5,000 (2016: 4,820) exhibitors from 76 countries presented their products and services at the fairground of Messe Frankfurt in an area of 315,000 sqm . Around 135,000 visitors from 184 countries came to the show.

With around 5,000 exhibitors, Automechanika is well established and is one of the most successful trade fair brands in the world.

The latest Automechanika Frankfurt took place from 10 to 14 September 2022. Over 2,800 exhibitors from around 70 countries presented their products and services at the fairground of Messe Frankfurt. Around 78,000 visitors from 175 countries came to the show.

The product groups of Automechanika:
 Accessories & Customizing
 Alternative Drive Systems & Fuels
 Body & Paint
 Car Wash & Care
 Dealer & Workshop-Management
 Diagnostics & Repair
 Electronics & Connectivity
 Mobility as a service & Autonomous Driving
 Parts & Components
 Tires & Wheeles 

The Automechanika trade fair brand has been exported to a variety of countries over recent years and 13 Automechanika fairs are currently held on four continents (Birmingham, Buenos Aires, Dubai, Frankfurt, Ho Chin Minh City, Istanbul, Johannesburg, Kuala Lumpur, Mexico-City, New Delhi, Nur-Sultan, Riyadh, Shanghai). 

The 10th Automechanika Buenos Aires took place from 7 to 10 November 2018. 451 exhibitors from 17 countries presented their products and services at the fairground of Sociedad Rural Argentina in an area of 35,000 sqm. 26,644 visitors from 39 countries came to the show.

The latest Automechanika Buenos Aires took place from 11 to 14 October 2022. Over 282 exhibitors and 700 brands from 14 countries presented their products and services at the fairground of Sociedad Rural Argentina in an area of 35,000 sqm . 22,671 visitors from 33 countries came to the show.

See also 
 Motortec

References

Links 
 www.automechanika.com − Automechanika
 www.automechanika-frankfurt.com − Automechanika Frankfurt
 www.messefrankfurt.com − Messe Frankfurt
 www.driving-news.com − Blog

Trade fairs in Germany